Togashi (written:  or ) is a Japanese surname. Notable people with the surname include:

, Japanese gravure idol
, Japanese footballer
, Japanese footballer
Hiroyuki Togashi (born 1955), Japanese politician
, Japanese footballer and manager
, shugo in the Muromachi period
, Japanese jazz percussionist and composer
, Japanese voice actress and singer
, Japanese film director
, Japanese manga artist
, Japanese basketball player
, Japanese footballer

See also
9277 Togashi, a main-belt asteroid

Japanese-language surnames